Amália Por Cuca Roseta is an album released by fado singer Cuca Roseta. It was released in 2020 by Sony Music. The album is Roseta's tribute to Amália Rodrigues, an album on which she interprets the classic fado songs of Amália. Roseta is accompanied on the album by Portuguese guitar (Mário Pacheco and Luís Guerreiro), fado viola (Diogo Clemente), and bass viola (Marino de Freitas). "Barco Negro" and two other songs also include percussion. Reviewer Leonor Alhinho wrote: Calm, intimate and of an excellent vocal quality, this album is a must for anyone who enjoys fado."

Track listing
 Vagamundo	
 Lágrima	
 Marcha Do Centenário	
 Ai Mouraria	
 Fado Malhoa	
 Fadista Louco	
 Marcha Da Mouraria	
 Com Que Voz	
 Estranha Forma De Vida	
 Barco Negro

References

Cuca Roseta albums
2020 albums
Portuguese-language albums
Sony Music albums